Bill Scher (born September 26, 1972) is an American pundit and liberal political analyst. He is the Politics Editor for the Washington Monthly. He also is a Contributing Editor to POLITICO Magazine, and a contributor to RealClearPolitics. He also co-hosts "The DMZ," an online TV show with conservative pundit Matt Lewis on YouTube. Scher is an alumnus of Oberlin College.

Early career 

Bill Scher founded LiberalOasis.com in 2002. In 2004, he became a regular commentator for Air America Radio's The Majority Report hosted by Sam Seder and Janeane Garofalo. In 2006, he contributed a chapter to the book Proud To Be Liberal and published his own book Wait! Don't Move To Canada!: A Stay-and-Fight Strategy to Win Back America (Rodale, 2006). He later became an editor and writer for the Campaign for America's Future website OurFuture.org.

Positions 
Scher has been known to take positions that are controversial within liberal circles. In 2012, he published an op-ed in The New York Times titled "How Liberals Win" which argued that liberals should treat "corporate power as a force to bargain with, not an enemy to vanquish". After the Edward Snowden leaks, he defended the record of the National Security Agency from a liberal perspective in essays for The Week and POLITICO Magazine. He defended his position in an appearance on MSNBC's The Last Word with Lawrence O'Donnell and later in a debate with Snowden's attorney Ben Wizner on MSNBC's Up with Steve Kornacki. He wrote articles critical of Bernie Sanders throughout the 2016 presidential primaries.

References

1972 births
Living people
Oberlin College alumni
American political journalists
American political commentators
American bloggers
21st-century American journalists
American male journalists
Journalists from New York City
American male bloggers
Politico people